Mission into Chaos! is a Man or Astro-man? 7-inch EP released on One Louder Records in 1993 and pressed exclusively on black vinyl. The back cover states that the songs are meant to be a soundtrack to the film of the same title which has been lost.

Track listing

Secret Agent Side
"Name of Numbers"
"Of Sex and Demise"

Double Agent Side
"Madness in the Streets"
"Within a Martian Heart"
"Point Blank"

Line Up
Star Crunch
Bird's tuff
Dr. Deleto and His Invisible Vaportron
Coco the Electronic Monkey Wizard

References

Man or Astro-man? EPs
1993 EPs